Ingerophrynus parvus is a species of toad in the family Bufonidae. It is found in southern Myanmar, southwestern Thailand, southwestern Cambodia, Peninsular Malaysia, and Java and Sumatra (Indonesia). Its natural habitats are primary and regenerating rainforests where it is found inhabiting streams. Breeding takes place in pools and slow-moving streams. It is common in the mainland but uncommon in Indonesia.

References

External links
 Amphibian and Reptiles of Peninsular Malaysia - Ingerophrynus parvus

parvus
Amphibians of Myanmar
Amphibians of Cambodia
Amphibians of Indonesia
Amphibians of Malaysia
Amphibians of Thailand
Amphibians described in 1887
Taxonomy articles created by Polbot